David Henry Ohle (born October 16, 1944) is a retired United States Army lieutenant general who served as Deputy Chief of Staff G-1 Personnel of The United States Army from 1998 to 2000.

Born in Youngstown, Ohio and raised in Steubenville, Ohio, Ohle graduated from the United States Military Academy with a B.S. degree in 1968. He later earned an M.A. degree in psychology from the Ohio State University in 1974.

Ohle served two combat tours in Vietnam and commanded a Ranger company there. He was awarded the Silver Star Medal, three Bronze Star Medals and two Air Medals. Ohle later commanded an infantry battalion at Fort Campbell and an infantry brigade at Schofield Barracks. He subsequently served as assistant commander of the 1st Infantry Division at Fort Riley.

References

1944 births
Living people
People from Youngstown, Ohio
People from Steubenville, Ohio
United States Military Academy alumni
United States Army Rangers
United States Army personnel of the Vietnam War
Recipients of the Air Medal
Recipients of the Silver Star
Ohio State University Graduate School alumni
Recipients of the Legion of Merit
United States Army generals